The PATMA Library is a university library, part of the National University of Malaysia in Bangi, Selangor, Malaysia.

References

External links
 PATMA Library Site

Academic libraries in Malaysia
Buildings and structures in Selangor
National University of Malaysia
1973 establishments in Malaysia
Libraries established in 1973